José Jorge Mezquita García (Vila-real, 1967), simply known as Mezquita, is a Valencian pilota professional player, one of the best reboters (bouncing scholars) of the Escala i corda variant in the ValNet company. He has been member of the Valencian Pilota Squad.

Trophies 
 Winner of the Circuit Bancaixa 2004, 2005 and 2006
 Runner-up of the Circuit Bancaixa 2007

Handball International Championships
 Winner World Championship, València 1996
 Winner World Championship, Maubeuge (France) 1998
 Winner World Championship, València 2000

References

Pilotaris from the Valencian Community
People from Villarreal
Sportspeople from the Province of Castellón
1967 births
Living people